Agropsar is a genus of Asian birds in the family Sturnidae. It is sometimes merged with Sturnus or Sturnia

These two species were formerly placed in the genus Sturnus. They were moved to the resurrected genus Agropsar based on the results of two molecular phylogenetic studies published in 2008.

Species

References

 
Bird genera
Taxa named by Eugene W. Oates